Turi or TURI may refer to:

Places
Ecuador
Turi, Ecuador, a town and parish

Estonia
 Türi, a town
 Türi Parish, a rural municipality in Järva County

Indonesia
 Turi, Lamongan, a district in Lamongan Regency, East Java
 Turi, Magetan, a village in Panekan, Magetan Regency, East Java
 Turi, Yogyakarta, a district in Sleman Regency, Yogyakarta

Italy
 Turi, Apulia, a comune in the province of Bari

Kenya
 Turi, Kenya, a settlement west of Nakuru

Persons with the name
"Turi" is also nickname for the given name Salvatore
 Turi (Māori ancestor), an historical Maori leader
 Indrek Turi (born 1981), Estonian decathlete
 Johan Turi (1854–1936), Norwegian-Sami wolf-hunter and writer
 Pasquale Turi (born 1993), Italian footballer
 Géza Turi (born 1974), Hungarian footballer

Other uses
 Turi (Caste), a social group of East India
 Turi (Pashtun tribe), a Pashtun tribe in Pakistan and Afghanistan
 Aheria, an ethnic group of India also known as Turi
 Turi language, a Munda language of India
 Turi (Māori ancestor), an historical Maori leader
 Turi, one of Queen Victoria's pets
 Massachusetts Toxics Use Reduction Institute (TURI)

See also 
 Thuri (disambiguation)